J. K. Galbraith is the name of:

 John Kenneth Galbraith (1908–2006), Canadian economist and public official
 James K. Galbraith (born 1952), American economist